Vaana is a 2008 Indian Telugu-language romantic drama film directed and produced by M. S. Raju. The film stars Vinay and Meera Chopra while Suman, Jayasudha, Naresh, Seetha, and Diganth play supporting roles. Music is composed by debutant Kamalakar. It is a remake of the 2006 Kannada-language film Mungaru Male. The film was dubbed into Tamil and released in 2013 under the title Gnabagangal Thaalattum.

Plot
Abhiram (Vinay) is the only son of Uma (Jayasudha) and Babji (Naresh). On a visit to a mall amidst a heavy wind, he spots a pretty girl named Nandini (Meera Chopra). Whilst staring at her, he inadvertently falls into a manhole. Nandini rescues him from the pit, but in the process loses her heart-shaped watch that she had just bought.

While accompanying his mother to Araku, Abhi confronts a man named Jaanu (Ajay). Jaanu, who has been following Nandini, beats up Abhi, mistaking him to be dating her. Abhi, unaware that Jaanu has vowed not to allow anyone near Nandini, thrashes him and his gang in return.

In Araku, Abhi meets Nandini unexpectedly. He identifies himself, expresses his love, and offers to tie the watch as an indication of his intention to marry her. Nandini, who is already engaged, rejects his proposal. Still, Abhi vows to marry her if she meets him again. Uma takes Abhi to her friend Bharathi's (Seetha) house. There, Abhi discovers that his host in Araku, Col. Choudary (Suman), is Nandini's father. Choudary is deaf, and Nandini's marriage is only a week away. Dejected, Abhi throws Nandini's watch away. Nandini calls him and asks him to meet her. Delighted, Abhi goes in search of her watch. While searching for it, he spots a rabbit, which he names Devadas and brings along with him. Eventually, he finds the watch.

Since Nandini's friends are due to arrive from Mumbai for the marriage, Abhi takes Nandini to the railway station. The train from Mumbai is delayed by five hours, so Nandini and Abhi decide to visit a nearby temple. While returning from the temple, Abhi and Nandini are caught in the rain. An old couple offers them shelter inside their hut. Abhi, still in two minds about expressing his love to Nandini, grabs a few toddy bottles, goes out in the rain, and starts drinking. When Nandini walks towards an intoxicated Abhi, offering an umbrella, he tells her that he had better stay away from her to keep from making a move on her.

Nandini is now in love with Abhi and is in a dilemma as her wedding is in a few days. She requests him to take her to the top of a waterfall and expresses her love to him, standing at the edge of the waterfall. Abhi, intent on marrying Nandini, takes Choudary for a morning jog to discuss his marriage with her, but Choudary, a heart patient, tells Abhi that he is expected to die anytime, and his only wish is to marry Nandini off to Gautam (Diganth). Later, Nandini asks Abhi if he told their story to her father, to which Abhi replies that he doubted her love. He is angered and insults her by saying that she betrayed her parents and asks her the guarantee that she will not betray him. Hurt, Nandini slaps Abhi and leaves in tears. On the night before the marriage, Abhi drives away without taking Devadas. He then starts drinking in a bar and finds Gautam asking the bar owner (Narsing Yadav) for directions to Choudary's home. When Jaanu tries to kill Gautam, Abhi saves Gautam and convinces himself that only Gautam is suitable to marry Nandini.

The following day, Abhi drops Gautam at the marriage venue but declines to attend the marriage. Gautam asks for the heart-shaped watch as a remembrance, but Abhi refuses to give it as he likes it himself. Abhi then wishes Gautham a happy married life. He then finds Devadas near his car and takes the rabbit in. Meanwhile, Gautam is marrying Nandini. Abhi drives to the waterfall where Nandini proposed to him, but as he is driving, Devadas dies. The story ends with Abhi burying Devadas's body near the edge of the waterfall.

Cast

 Vinay as Abhiram
 Meera Chopra as Nandini
 Suman as Col. Chowdary
 Jayasudha as Uma
 Naresh as Babji
 Seetha as Bharati
 Diganth as Gautam
 Ajay as Jaanu
 Paruchuri Venkateswara Rao as Chowdary's friend
 Krishnudu as Mani, Chowdary's servant
 M. S. Narayana as Wrong Number caller
 Narsing Yadav as Bar Owner
 Dharmavarapu Subramanyam as Vithal
 Rajitha as Vithal's wife
 Prabhu Deva in a cameo appearance in the song "Unnattaa Lenattaa"
 Sunil in a cameo appearance

Production 

After starring in director Jeeva's Unnale Unnale (2007), a Tamil and debut in cinema, co-starring Sadha and Tanisha Mukherjee, Vinay chose yet another film, for his Telugu debut. Director M. S. Raju wanted to remake Kannada language blockbuster film Mungaru Male, which featured Ganesh and Pooja Gandhi. Meera Chopra was added to the cast as lead heroine. Diganth reprised his role from the original.

Soundtrack
The soundtrack of this film is composed by Kamalakar. This album consisted of eight tracks out of which two tunes (Anisuthide and Mungaru Male) from the original Kannada film were retained (Aakasa Ganga and Yeduta Nilichindi). All the lyrics were penned Sirivennela Seetharama Sastry.

Release 
The film released on 15 January 2008, which received mixed to Negative reviews. Sify praised the performances of several members of the cast.

The film flopped at the box-office, and it was dubbed in Tamil as Gnabagangal Thalattum in 2013.

References

2008 films
2000s Telugu-language films
2008 romantic drama films
2000s romantic musical films
Indian romantic drama films
Indian romantic musical films
Telugu remakes of Kannada films
Films set in Karnataka
Films shot in Karnataka
2008 directorial debut films
Films directed by M. S. Raju